Guoyuan Town is a town in the center of Changsha County, Changsha, Hunan Province, China. It administers seven villages and two communities.

Divisions of Changsha County
Changsha County